The 201st Coastal Division was an infantry division of the Royal Italian Army during World War II. Royal Italian Army coastal divisions were second line divisions formed with reservists and equipped with second rate materiel. Recruited locally, they were often commanded by officers called out of retirement.

History 
The division was activated on 1 November 1942 in Genoa by expanding the I Coastal Brigade. The division was assigned to XV Army Corps and in December 1942 moved to Savona. The division was responsible for the coastal defense of the coast of Liguria between Menton in occupied France and Punta del Mesco near La Spezia. In January 1943 the division moved its headquarter to Menton.

After the announcement of the Armistice of Cassibile on 8 September 1943 the division was disbanded by invading German forces.

Organization 
 201st Coastal Division, in Savona
 Harbor Defense Command Genoa, in Genoa
 102nd Coastal Regiment
 5th Coastal Regiment
 CCV Coastal Battalion
 CCCXXIV Coastal Battalion
 CDLXXXI Coastal Battalion
 XV Machine Gun Battalion
 CXI Machine Gun Battalion
 131st Coastal Regiment
 X Dismounted Squadrons Group/ Regiment "Lancieri di Vittorio Emanuele II"
 XXI Coastal Battalion
 CCVI Coastal Battalion
 CDLXXXII Coastal Battalion
 5th Coastal Artillery Regiment
 V Coastal Artillery Group (1x battery 105/28 howitzers and 1x battery 149/35 heavy guns)
 VI Coastal Artillery Group (1x battery 105/28 howitzers and 1x battery 149/35 heavy guns; detached to Harbor Defense Command Genoa)
 CXXV Coastal Artillery Group (3x batteries 105/15 howitzers)
 CXXXII Coastal Artillery Group (1x battery 75/17 cannons and 2x batteries 105/15 howitzers)
 52nd Anti-paratroopers Unit
 53rd Anti-paratroopers Unit
 54th Anti-paratroopers Unit
 201st Carabinieri Section
 1x Field Post Office
 Divisional Services

Attached to the division:
 1st Army Artillery Grouping (from 4 December 1942)
 I Group (3x batteries 149/35 heavy guns)
 II Group (3x batteries 149/35 heavy guns)
 LXI Group (3x batteries 152/13 howitzers)
 LXII Group (2x batteries 152/13 howitzers)
 7th Army Artillery Grouping (from 15 November 1942)
 IX Group (3x batteries 149/35 heavy guns)
 X Group (3x batteries 149/35 heavy guns)
 XI Group (3x batteries 149/35 heavy guns)
 XII Group (3x batteries 149/35 heavy guns)
 Marimobil, in Genoa (Royal Italian Navy)
 Armored Train 120/2/S, in Vado Ligure (4x 120/45 Mod. 1918 naval guns, 4x 20/77 anti-aircraft guns)
 Armored Train 152/4/T, in Albisola Superiore (4x 152/40 naval guns, 4x 20/77 anti-aircraft guns)
 Armored Train 152/5/S, in Voltri (4x 152/40 naval guns, 4x 20/77 anti-aircraft guns)
 Armored Train 76/1/S, in Sampierdarena (6x 76/40 Mod. 1916 naval guns, 4x 20/77 anti-aircraft guns)

Commanding officers 
The division's commanding officers were:

 Generale di Brigata Costantino Salvi (1 November 1942 - 1943)
 Generale di Divisione Enrico Gazzale (1943 - 8 September 1943)

References 

 
 

Coastal divisions of Italy
Infantry divisions of Italy in World War II